Charles Simon Warner (born 19 November 1938) is an English former first-class cricketer.

Warner was born at Liverpool in November 1938. He was educated at Repton School, before going up to Keble College, Oxford. While studying at Oxford, he played first-class cricket for Oxford University in 1962, making seven appearances. Playing as a batsman, Warner scored a total of 365 runs in his seven matches, at an average of 26.07 and a high score of 77, which came against Essex. In club cricket, he played for Liverpool Cricket Club for twenty years between 1957 and 1977.

References

External links

1938 births
Living people
Cricketers from Liverpool
People educated at Repton School
Alumni of Keble College, Oxford
English cricketers
Oxford University cricketers